The Honeysuckle Breeze is the debut album by American jazz saxophonist Tom Scott featuring performances recorded in 1967 for the Impulse! label.

Parts of the saxophone solo in "Today" were sampled in "They Reminisce Over You," by jazz rap duo Pete Rock & CL Smooth, off their critically acclaimed 1992 album Mecca and the Soul Brother.

Reception
The Allmusic review by Scott Yanow awarded the album 1½ stars stating "The dated effects, weak material, and the brevity of the performances make this a rather forgettable commercial record. Only of historical interest".

Track listing
 "The Honeysuckle Breeze" (Ian Freebairn-Smith) - 4:15
 "Never My Love (Donald Addrisi, Richard Addrisi) - 3:20
 "She's Leaving Home" (John Lennon, Paul McCartney) - 2:17
 "Naima" (John Coltrane) - 2:45
 "Mellow Yellow" (Donovan Leitch) - 4:15
 "Baby, I Love You" (Jimmy Holliday, Ronnie Shannon) - 3:21
 "Today" (Marty Balin, Paul Kantner) - 3:20
 "North" (Joan Baez) - 4:30
 "Blues for Hari" (Tom Scott) - 3:57
 "Deliver Me" (Danny Moore) - 2:49
Recorded in Los Angeles, California on September 18, 1967 (tracks 2, 3 & 10), September 19, 1967 (tracks 6-8)  and September 20, 1967 (tracks 1, 4, 5 & 9)

Personnel
Tom Scott - tenor saxophone, soprano saxophone, flute
Mike Melvoin - piano, organ, harpsichord (tracks 1-5, 9 & 10)
Lincoln Mayorga - piano harpsichord (tracks 6-8)
Bill Plummer - sitar
Dennis Budimir (tracks 2, 3, 6-8 & 10), Glen Campbell (tracks 2, 3, 6-8 & 10), Louis Morell (tracks 1, 4, 5 & 9) - guitar
Max Bennett (tracks 1, 4, 5 & 9), Carol Kaye (tracks 2, 3, 6-8 & 10) - electric bass
Jimmy Gordon - drums
Gene Estes (tracks 1, 4, 5 & 9), Emil Richards (tracks 2, 3 & 10) - percussion
The California Dreamers: Ron Hicklin, Al Capps, Loren Farber, John Bahler, Tom Bahler, Ian Freebairn-Smith, Sally Stevens, Sue Allen, Jackie Ward - vocals

References

Impulse! Records albums
Tom Scott (saxophonist) albums
1967 debut albums
Albums produced by Bob Thiele